Dave Randall is a British musician and writer. He is best known for his work as guitarist with Faithless and for his own band, Slovo. His playing credits include  Sinead O'Connor, Dido, Emiliana Torrini and 1 Giant Leap. He is author of the book Sound System – The Political Power of Music (Pluto Press 2017). He lives in Brixton, South London.

Musical biography
Randall played guitar with Faithless from 1996–1999 and 2004–2011. He is also founder of the South London based music collective Slovo, who have released three albums: nommo (2002), TodoCambia (2007), and Bread & Butterflies (2020). A largely acoustic and instrumental solo album, Eight Stories, was released under the artist name Randall in 2004. He joined vocalist Mike Ladd, percussionist Dirk Rothbrust and clarinettist Carol Robinson in the Paris-based experimental band Sleeping In Vilna. The band released the largely improvised album Why Waste Time in 2012.

He has also recorded and toured with Dido, Emiliana Torrini, 1 Giant Leap, Sinead O'Connor and others. He currently performs with Roland Gift (Fine Young Cannibals).

Randall has composed music for stage and screen including scores for two feature-length documentary films: Rebuilding Hope (2009) and Witness Bahrain (2014).

Political activism and writing
Randall has been associated with a number of leftwing campaigns and organisations. He was a member of the Socialist Workers Party (Britain) from 2004 until 2013 and has performed for the Stop The War Coalition, Love Music Hate Racism and the People's Assembly Against Austerity. He is also a patron of the Palestine Solidarity Campaign.

His book about music and politics, Sound System: The Political Power of Music, was published by Pluto Press in 2017  and he has subsequently given guest lectures on the subject at a number of universities and conferences in the UK, Ireland, USA, Canada and South Africa.

He has also written for The Guardian and is a regular contributor to the Brixton Blog and  Counterfire.

References

External links

British writers
British human rights activists
British social reformers
British electronic musicians
Living people
Year of birth missing (living people)